Flavicella marina is a Gram-negative, mesophilic, rod-shaped, aerobic and non-motile bacterium from the genus of Flavicella which has been isolated from surface seawater near Muroto, Japan. Flavicella marina produces carotenoid.

References 

Flavobacteria
Bacteria described in 2015